Brudenell may refer to:

Places in Canada
Brudenell, Ontario
Brudenell, Prince Edward Island

Surname
Brudenell Baronets
James Brudenell (disambiguation)
 Thomas Brudenell (disambiguation)

Music
Brudenell Social Club, a music venue in Hyde Park, Leeds, England.